The Salcedo Park Condominium are high-end residential condominium  skyscrapers located in Makati, Philippines. The twin 45-storey buildings were completed  in 2001 and rises to 151 metres (495 feet) from the ground to its architectural top. It was the tallest residential twin towers from 1996 until the completion of Pacific Plaza Towers in 2001.

References

External links
 Salcedo Park Tower 1 at Emporis
 Salcedo Park Tower 2 at Emporis

Skyscrapers in Makati
Residential skyscrapers in Metro Manila
Residential buildings completed in 1996
Twin towers
Residential condominiums